Stolidosomatinae is a subfamily of flies in the family Dolichopodidae. According to Germann et al. (2011), the subfamily is monophyletic but should actually be placed within Sympycninae.

Genera
The subfamily includes three genera:
Pseudosympycnus Robinson, 1967
Stolidosoma Becker, 1922
Sympycnidelphus Robinson, 1964

References

 

Dolichopodidae subfamilies
Taxa named by Theodor Becker